Sir Charles Henry Major (30 October 1860 – 31 August 1933) was a British judge, who served in various colonies around the Caribbean, as well as in Fiji.

Biography
Born in St Kitts, Major was the son of Charles Henry Major Sr., manager of the Colonial Bank of the West Indies, and Francis Frederica Clinckett, of Barbados. He was called to the bar at the Middle Temple, and practised Law in the Leeward Islands from 1887.

He was Chancellor of the Diocese of Antigua from 1889 to 1899, a member of the Legislative Council of Antigua from 1895 to 1899, and a member and President of the General Legislative Council of the Leeward Islands from 1896 to 1900. He served as a member of the Federal Executive Council of the Leeward Islands from 1897 to 1901, as Vice-President of the Legislative Council of Antigua from 1897 to 1899, and Attorney General of Grenada from 1901 to 1902, when he transferred to Fiji.

He was appointed Chief Judicial Commissioner for the Western Pacific and Chief Justice of Fiji in September 1902, serving as such until 1914, then as Chief Justice of British Guiana from 1914 till his death in 1933. During his term as Chief Justice of Fiji, he was ex officio a member of the Legislative Council, and acted as Governor of Fiji in an interim capacity from 1910 to 21 February 1911.

He was given a knighthood in 1911 while serving as Chief Justice of Fiji.

References

|-

|-

1860 births
1933 deaths
Members of the Middle Temple
Governors of Fiji
Colony of Fiji judges
Knights Bachelor
Chief justices of Fiji
Chief Justices of British Guiana
Members of the Legislative Council of Antigua
Attorneys General of British Grenada
Members of the General Legislative Council of the Leeward Islands
Chief judicial commissioners for the Western Pacific